4/1 may refer to:
April 1 (month-day date notation)
January 4 (day-month date notation)
4 divided by 1 (4)